George Chann (1913-1995) was a Chinese American painter.

He was born in Guangzhou, China on January 1, 1913. He lived with his father in Stockton, California for some of the time during his youth. He attended Sun Yat-sen University. In 1932 he emigrated to the United States.

In 1933 he began studying at the Otis Art Institute and after his graduating began teaching there in addition to exhibiting.

His work can be divided into two stages, prior to the 1950s his work was mostly portrait paintings and some still life paintings and landscape paintings. In the 1950s his art underwent a change becoming more abstract and increasingly incorporated Chinese artifacts in their production, for example by rubbing them with oracle bones.

His work experienced an increase in popularity after his death on May 26, 1995.

References 

American people of Chinese descent
20th-century American painters
1913 births
1995 deaths
Artists from Guangzhou
Republic of China (1912–1949) emigrants to the United States
Artists from Stockton, California
Painters from Guangdong